Rho GTPase-activating protein 4 is an enzyme that in humans is encoded by the ARHGAP4 gene. It has been shown to regulate cell motility and axonal outgrowth in vitro.

References

External links

Further reading